Ian Stewart Clarkson (born 4 December 1970) is an English former professional footballer who made nearly 400 appearances in the Football League playing as a defender for Birmingham City, Stoke City, Northampton Town and Kidderminster Harriers.

Playing career
Ian Clarkson was born in Solihull, West Midlands. He began his football career as a YTS trainee with Birmingham City, the club he had supported since childhood, in 1987. He made his first team debut as a 17-year-old in the League Cup against Aston Villa in September 1988, and his Football League debut a few days later. He signed his first professional contract in December 1988. In 1991, he played in Birmingham's winning side in the Associate Members' Cup final at Wembley. The following season, he captained the side to promotion from the Third Division while still only 21, an achievement which he considers to be the highlight of his career.

Former Birmingham manager Lou Macari brought Clarkson to First Division side Stoke City in September 1993 for a fee of £40,000. He spent three seasons at Stoke, and played in the First Division play-offs, in which Stoke lost to Martin O'Neill's Leicester City side in the 1996 semi-final. When his contract expired he rejected Stoke's offer of renewal terms, and left for Third Division side Northampton Town.

At Northampton, he linked up with former Birmingham City teammates John Gayle, Dean Peer and manager Ian Atkins, soon to be joined by John Frain. In his first season, he helped them to promotion via the play-offs, and the next year played in the Second Division play-off final, but lost 1–0 to Grimsby Town. In August 1998, he suffered a badly broken tibia in a match against Lincoln City. Though he made a couple of appearances for Northampton at the start of the 1999–2000 season, it appeared that he was no longer fit enough to compete at that level, and that his league career was over at the age of 28.

Clarkson went to train at Kidderminster Harriers, which was then a Conference club, and regained sufficient fitness to be able to play regularly at that level. Kidderminster made him club captain, and of his first 30 games for the club they lost only one; at the end of the season the club were promoted to the Football League as Conference champions. They repaid the insurance payout that Clarkson had received on his retirement due to injury, so that he was able to play for them in the Football League. When Jan Molby resigned as manager of Kidderminster in March 2002, Clarkson acted as assistant to caretaker manager Ian Britton. The club released him at the end of that season for financial reasons. He joined Nuneaton Borough of the Conference, and was released in December again on financial grounds. He then registered for short periods with Stafford Rangers, Leamington and, from March 2003, Forest Green Rovers, finally retiring at the end of the season.

In 2012, he returned to football to sign for Alvechurch in September 2012 at the age of 41.

Life after football
Clarkson qualified as a coach and coach educator, and worked for Birmingham City's Football in the Community programme. During the later years of his playing career he was keen to get involved in media work; from 2002 he was employed as a football reporter and journalist by the Birmingham Post and Sunday Mercury newspapers and by the Professional Footballers' Association (PFA)'s website. In 2006, he was appointed to manage a scheme designed to involve young people in sport and physical activity, as part of a wider programme of regeneration of the deprived areas of North Solihull.
Clarkson now works as a PE Teacher at Repton Prep School in Derbyshire, where he has been based since 2010.

Career statistics

Honours
Birmingham City
 Football League Trophy : 1991
 Football League Third Division runner-up: 1991–92

Northampton Town
 Football League Third Division play-offs: 1997

Kidderminster Harriers
 Conference National: 1999–2000

References

External links
 
 
 Guardian article on Clarkson's change of career
 Birmingham Post article by Clarkson on how sport can make a difference

1970 births
Living people
Sportspeople from Solihull
English footballers
Association football defenders
Birmingham City F.C. players
Stoke City F.C. players
Northampton Town F.C. players
Kidderminster Harriers F.C. players
Nuneaton Borough F.C. players
Stafford Rangers F.C. players
Leamington F.C. players
Forest Green Rovers F.C. players
Alvechurch F.C. players
English Football League players
National League (English football) players